Hide & Seek is a 1997 novel written by thriller novel writer James Patterson.

Plot
Maggie Bradford is a successful singer/songwriter who is on trial for murder. She has married twice and it appears that she has shot both husbands. Due to Maggie Bradford's history of killing her first husband to get out of the abusive ways, it began to fuel speculation and accusations when she had again killed her second husband. And the world around her wants to know if this celebrity can really commit these murders.she dies 

1997 American novels
Novels by James Patterson
Courtroom novels
Little, Brown and Company books